Sergei Alexandrovich Leonov — Russian journalists, senior editor and an important author of Computerra weekly. He is the author of numerous articles about IT and modern science.

Biography 

 Since 1997 — prints in Computerra
 1998—2004 — senior editor of Computerra
 2004—2006 — editor-in-chief of Computerra
 с 2006 — senior editor of Computerra

As a Journalist 

Sergei Leonov is the author of several hundred articles, published in: Computerra, Home Computer, Infobusiness, CIO, Business-magazine. He was an editor-in-chief of Computerra for three years. Now he is a senior editor.

External links 
 Leonov's articles (in Russian)

Russian journalists
Living people
Year of birth missing (living people)